Cinemax Asia is a pan-Asian pay television channel as a part of the HBO Asia network. It features action, science-fiction, thriller, and adult comedy films. Cinemax Asia is headquartered in Warner Bros. Discovery Asia office in Singapore.

History

Cinemax Asia (15 November 1996– 28 March 2009) 
Cinemax Asia (which is the secondary channel of HBO Asia) was launched in 15 November 1996, it is a 24-hour movie channel which features movies in horror, suspense, thriller and action. Cinemax Asia features Thriller Cinemax on Thursday, Action Cinemax on Friday while Cinemax Superstars on weekend.

In Malaysia, Cinemax Asia was launched on Astro on channel number 18 replacing the ill-fated MGM Gold channel on August 24, 1998.

Max Asia (29 March 2009–30 September 2012) 
In March 2009, Cinemax Asia was rebranded as "Max Asia" to appeal to male viewers. Max Asia's logo has been redesigned as well in line with the rebranding. Under registered permission HBO Network, Max Asia became an American movies channel.

Cinemax Asia (1 October 2012–present) 
Max Asia changes its ident, its yellow background color is replaced by a red color with a more bolder approach to match its original American counterpart, with new action and thriller movies and it is now a competitor to its rival Fox Action Movies.

During October 2021, Cinemax Asia featured horror films in a Maximum Horror promotion.

Logo

See also 
 HBO
 HBO Asia
 Cinemax
 Red by HBO

References

External links 
 Cinemax Asia's official site

Cinemax
Cinemax
Cinemax
Movie channels
Movie channels in Hong Kong
Movie channels in Macau
Movie channels in the Philippines
Movie channels in Thailand
Movie channels in Vietnam
Movie channels in China
Movie channels in Taiwan
Movie channels in Malaysia
Movie channels in Indonesia
Movie channels in Singapore
Movie channels in South Korea
Movie channels in Japan
Movie channels in Australia
Movie channels in New Zealand
English-language television stations
Television channels and stations established in 1996